OBrien Island is located  at the western end of the Beagle Channel.

East of the island is the Paso Darwin, that is the beginning of the Beagle Channel. To the north is the Isla Grande de Tierra del Fuego, separated by the Pomar Channel. To the South is the Guillermo Island and the Londonderry Island separated by the O'Brien Channel.

External links
United States Hydrographic Office, South America Pilot (1916)
UN System-wide Earthwatch Web Site, O'Brien Island

Islands of Magallanes Region